The Ashland Daily Tidings was a morning newspaper serving the city of Ashland, Oregon, United States. It was owned by Rosebud Media, like its sister publication, the Medford-based Mail Tribune, which it continued to publish until announcing that paper would close on January 13, 2023.

The Daily Tidings was distributed Monday through Saturday mornings (Saturday afternoon publication was changed under Editor Andrew Scot Bolsinger in 2004; Circulation Director Ed Rose changed the Daily Tidings from afternoon production to morning in December 2010). It was one of Oregon's smallest-circulation dailies, along with the Baker City Herald in the state's northeast region.

On July 15, 2021, the owner of the Daily Tidings announced the paper would be replaced with an Ashland Edition of the Mail Tribune starting August 1, 2021.

History 
Edd Ellsworth Rountree was the owner and publisher from 1960 to 1970, and was known for his left-leaning column "Friday Fish Fry."

The Daily Tidings was owned, along with the Medford Mail Tribune and a number of other newspapers around the United States, by the Local Media Group, a subsidiary of international company News Corp. On September 4, 2013, News Corp announced that it would sell Local Media Group to Newcastle Investment Corp., an affiliate of Fortress Investment Group, for $87 million. The newspapers were to be operated by GateHouse Media, a newspaper group owned by Fortress. News Corp CEO and former Wall Street Journal editor Robert James Thomson indicated that the newspapers were "not strategically consistent with the emerging portfolio" of the company. GateHouse in turn filed prepackaged Chapter 11 bankruptcy on September 27, 2013, to restructure its debt obligations in order to accommodate the acquisition.

In 2017, the Tidings and the Mail Tribune were sold by GateHouse to Rosebud Media.

Awards 
The Tidings was one of three daily newspapers to win the Charles Sprague Award of General Excellence from the Oregon Newspaper Publishers Association (ONPA) in 1981. In 2006 the Daily Tidings was awarded the "General Excellence" prize by the ONPA. In 2015, it won five awards including a first place for best educational coverage, from the ONPA.

References

External links
2006 Better Newspaper Contest winners, ONPA

1876 establishments in Oregon
Ashland, Oregon
Mass media in Jackson County, Oregon
Newspapers published in Jackson County, Oregon
Newspapers published in Oregon
Oregon Newspaper Publishers Association
Publications established in 1876

Defunct newspapers published in Oregon
2021 disestablishments in Oregon